Alexandre Mihalesco (born Alexandru Mihăilescu, ; 19 October 1883 – 28 December 1974) was a Romanian film actor who largely appeared in French productions.

Selected filmography

 The Independence of Romania (1912)
 On the Waves of Happiness (1920)
 The Crystal Submarine (1927)
 The Passion of Joan of Arc (1928)
 Accused, Stand Up! (1930)
 Levy and Company (1930)
 Nights of Princes (1930)
 Little Lise (1930)
 The Sweetness of Loving (1930)
 Southern Cross (1932)
 The Levy Department Stores (1932)
 Buridan's Donkey (1932)
 Night of Temptation (1932)
 Judex (1934)
 The Uncle from Peking (1934)
 The Call of Silence (1936)
Bach the Detective (1936)
 Mercadet (1936)
 The Phantom Gondola (1936)
 Woman of Malacca (1937)
 The Secrets of the Red Sea (1937)
 Tricoche and Cacolet (1938)
 Rasputin (1938)
 Storm Over Asia (1938)
 Golden Venus (1938)
 Le Duel (1939)
 His Uncle from Normandy (1939)
 Vidocq (1939)
 The Five Cents of Lavarede (1939)
 Night Warning (1946)
 Barry (1949)
 Darling Caroline (1951)
 The Road to Damascus (1952)
 Rasputin (1954)

References

Bibliography
 Goble, Alan. The Complete Index to Literary Sources in Film. Walter de Gruyter, 1999.

External links

1883 births
1974 deaths
French male film actors
French male silent film actors
20th-century French male actors
Romanian male film actors
Romanian male silent film actors
Romanian emigrants to France
Male actors from Bucharest